Selak is a surname. Notable people with the surname include:

Frane Selak (born 1929), Croatian music teacher alleged to have escaped death several times
Fred N. Selak (1865–1926), The Hermit of Grand Lake, Colorado, murdered by hanging
Mirko Selak (born 1978), Croatian footballer

Croatian surnames